is a passenger railway station in located in the city of Fujiidera,  Osaka Prefecture, Japan, operated by the private railway operator Kintetsu Railway. It is the main station of the city and was the nearest station to Fujiidera Stadium, formerly the home of the Kintetsu Buffaloes.

Lines
Fujiidera Station is served by the Minami Osaka Line, and is located 13.7 rail kilometers from the starting point of the line at Ōsaka Abenobashi Station.

Station layout
The station was consists of two ground-level island platforms connected by an elevated station building.  There is a storage track in the west of the station, extending from Track 1.

Platforms

Adjacent stations

History
Fujiidera Station opened on April 18, 1922.

Passenger statistics
In fiscal 2018, the station was used by an average of 35,802 passengers daily.

Surrounding area
AEON Mall Fujiidera
Fujiidera City Hall
Fujii-dera (Kansai Kannon Pilgrimage No. 5)
Fujiidera Elementary School
Fujiidera-nishi Elementary School
Fujiidera Junior High School
Osaka Women's Junior College, Junior College High School
Osaka Prefectural Fujiidera Technology High School
Shitennoji Gakuen Elementary School

Bus stops
These bus services are operated by Kintetsu Bus Co., Ltd.
South side
Bus stop 1
Route 71 for Shitennoji University via Fujigaoka, Nonaka and Karusato
Route 78 for Shitennoji University via Fujigaoka and Nonoue
Bus stop 2 (for Fujigaoka and Nonaka)
Route 72 for Fujigaoka, Nonaka, Habikigaoka Hatchome and Habikigaoka-nishi Sanchome
Route 73 for Habikigaoka-nishi Sanchome via Fujigaoka, Nonaka and Habikigaoka-nishi Nichome
Route 74 for -ekimae via Fujigaoka and Nonaka
Route 75 for Fujigaoka, Nonaka, Habikigaoka-nishi Sanchome, Habikigaoka Hatchome
Route 77 for Furuichi-ekimae via Fujigaoka and Habikino City Hall
Route 84 for Gakuen-mae Gochome via Nonaka, Habikiyama Jutaku-mae, Momoyamadai Nichome
Bus stop 3 (for Nonoue)
Route 61 for Shitennoji University via Nonoue and Habikiyama Jutaku-mae
Route 62 for Nonoue, Habikigaoka Hatchome and Habikigaoka-nishi Sanchome
Route 63 for Habikigaoka-nishi Sanchome via Nonoue and Habikigaoka-nishi Nichome
Route 64 for Furuichi-ekimae via Nonoue and Karusato Sanchome
Route 65 for Nonoue, Habikigaoka-nishi Sanchome, Habikigaoka Hatchome
Route 66 for Habikigaoka-nishi Nichome-higashi via Nonoue and Habikigaoka Hatchome
Route 83 for Gakuen-mae Gochome via Nonoue, Habikiyama Jutaku-mae, Momoyamadai Nichome
North side
Route 70 for -ekimae via -ekimae, Minami-Taishido and 
Route 71 for Minami-Taishido via Yaominami-ekimae
the "Flying Liner" for Yokohama Station West Gate, Tokyo Station Yaesu Dori and Tohoku Kyuko Bus Tokyo Office

See also
List of railway stations in Japan

References

External links

 Kintetsu: Fujiidera Station 

Railway stations in Japan opened in 1922
Railway stations in Osaka Prefecture
Fujiidera